Concepción "Concha" Montaner Coll (born 14 January 1981 L'Eliana, Valencia) is a Spanish long jumper.

She took the gold medal the World Junior Championships in 2000. At the 2006 World Indoor Championships she won her first major international senior medal when she finished third with 6.76 metres - the same result as the silver medalist Naide Gomes. Gomes beat Montaner on countback, due to a longer next best jump. In 2007 Montaner won the silver medal at the European Indoor Championships, behind Gomes.

Her personal best jump is 6.92 metres, achieved in July 2005 in Madrid.

She is also a national indoor champion over 60 metres.

Achievements

External links

1981 births
Living people
Spanish female long jumpers
Athletes (track and field) at the 2000 Summer Olympics
Athletes (track and field) at the 2008 Summer Olympics
Athletes (track and field) at the 2012 Summer Olympics
Athletes (track and field) at the 2016 Summer Olympics
Olympic athletes of Spain
Mediterranean Games gold medalists for Spain
Mediterranean Games bronze medalists for Spain
Athletes (track and field) at the 2001 Mediterranean Games
Athletes (track and field) at the 2005 Mediterranean Games
Mediterranean Games medalists in athletics
People from Camp de Túria
Sportspeople from the Province of Valencia